Macropetalichthys is a genus of placoderm fish, named by Norwood and Owen in 1846; the name "Macropetalichthys" means "armour-plated fish". It was assigned to Arthrodira by Woodward (1891); and to Petalichthida by Sepkoski (2002). It contains a single species, M. rapheidolabis.

 Range: Early Devonian of Europe, China & Australia
 Characters: Like primitive Arthrodira. Dorsoventrally compressed; orbits face dorsally; widely splayed pectoral fins, with cornua common; no post-pectoral plates; plates ornamented with linear rows of tubercles; strictly benthonic?

References

Monotypic fish genera
Placoderm genera
Placoderms of Asia
Placoderms of Australia
Placoderms of Europe
Petalichthyida